The Danube Expressway or Galați–Brăila Expressway is an expressway under construction in the south-eastern part of Romania, that will probably be labelled as the DEx6.

Under construction as of 2021, the expressway is being built by the Romanian company Spedition UMB with scheduled opening in 2023, costing 371 million lei. It is part of the series of major infrastructure projects planned within the proposed Danube metropolitan area, which includes a bridge over the Danube river in Brăila.

See also
Roads in Romania
Transport in Romania

References

Proposed roads in Romania
Expressways in Romania